Pascal Boniani Koeu better known by his stage name Skalpovich, is a French record producer, composer, songwriter and record executive. Between 2001 and 2006, he was part of duo Kore & Skalp with DJ and producer Kore before continuing solo.

Biography

Beginning / Kore & Skalp

Born in Épinay-sur-Seine (Paris suburb), Skalpovich began his music career as a DJ, producing several mixtapes under the name of "DJ Skalp" in the late 1990s. In 2001, he produced his first solo tracks named Les Chipies for the only album of the R&B girlgroup Honneur Ô Dames. Focusing on composition and production, he created the first French hip hop hitmaker team Kore & Skalp with DJ Kore.  Kore & Skalp separated in 2006.

Solo career
After separation, Skalpovich chose to develop his solo career, and took the time to form a new team and to participate to new projects. He entirely produced NBA player Tony Parker's first album titled TP (released in March 2007).

Discography

Promo singles

Albums

References

Living people
Year of birth missing (living people)
French people of Cambodian descent
French musicians
French record producers
French hip hop record producers